Arendt is a German surname.

Notable people with the surname include:

 Aleksander Arendt (1912–2002), president of Kashubian-Pomeranian Association
 Gisela Arendt (1918–1969), German swimmer
 Hannah Arendt (1906–1975), German Jewish political theorist
 Helga Arendt (1964–2013), German sprinter
 Nicole Arendt (born 1969), American tennis player
 Ronny Arendt (born 1980), German professional ice hockey player
 Walter Arendt (1925–2005), German politician

See also 
 Arendt de Roy (died 1589), Swedish architect
 Arendt-Seymour
 Kemp-Arendt

German-language surnames
Jewish surnames

fr:Arendt